The  was held on 5 February 2006 in Kannai Hall, Yokohama, Kanagawa, Japan.

Awards
 Best Film: Pacchigi!
 Best Actor: Joe Odagiri – House of Himiko, Scrap Heaven, Princess Raccoon Shinobi: Heart Under Blade
 Best Actress: Yūko Tanaka – Itsuka dokusho suruhi, Hibi
 Best Supporting Actor: Ittoku Kishibe – Itsuka dokusho suruhi, Hibi, Bōkoku no Iijisu, Vital
 Best Supporting Actress: Hiroko Yakushimaru – Always Sanchōme no Yūhi, Princess Raccoon, Lakeside Murder Case, Tetsujin 28-go
 Best Director: Kazuyuki Izutsu – Pacchigi!
 Best New Director: Kenji Uchida – A Stranger of Mine
 Best Screenplay: Kenji Aoki – Itsuka dokusho suruhi
 Best Cinematography: Hideo Yamamoto  – Pacchigi!, The Great Yokai War, Tetsujin 28-go
 Best New Talent:
Maki Horikita – Always Sanchōme no Yūhi, Gyakkyo Nine, Hinokio, Shinku
Erika Sawajiri – Pacchigi!, Ashurajō no Hitomi, Shinobi: Heart Under BladeShun Shioya – Pacchigi! Best Technical: Takashi Yamazaki – Always Sanchōme no Yūhi – For the VFX.
 Special Jury Prize: Kenji Uchida – A Stranger of MineBest 10
 Pacchigi! Itsuka dokusho suruhi Always Sanchōme no Yūhi A Stranger of Mine Linda Linda Linda Nana Hibi Hanging Garden House of Himiko Sayonara Midori-chanrunner-up. Ki no Umi''

References

Yokohama Film Festival
Y
Y
2006 in Japanese cinema
February 2006 events in Japan